Bethel station is a commuter rail station on the Danbury Branch of the Metro-North Railroad New Haven Line, located in Bethel, Connecticut.

History

The original Bethel station opened in 1852 on the Danbury and Norwalk Railroad. The original station building eventually burned down on December 15, 1898, as a result of an overheated stove. The station was eventually replaced the following year in 1899. The 1899-built station served passengers until 1996, when it was taken out of service but not demolished. The current station on Durant Avenue was built in 1996 and succeeds the previous station on Depot Place. The old station is still standing, but trains no longer stop at it. The building subsequently became a bicycle shop, then a brewery.

Station layout
The station has a five-car-long high-level side platform to the east of the single track. The station has 197 parking spaces, all owned by the state. Most of these are permit spaces, but there is also metered parking available. The station building is open during rush hours and has a bakery, seating area, and restroom, but no ticket machines. The station is operated by the town of Bethel, though it is owned by ConnDOT.

References

External links

Connecticut Department of Transportation, "Condition Inspection Bethel Station" report, July 2002

Stations along New York, New Haven and Hartford Railroad lines
Metro-North Railroad stations in Connecticut
Railroad stations in Fairfield County, Connecticut
Railway stations in the United States opened in 1996
Buildings and structures in Bethel, Connecticut